BFC Dynamo is a German football club based in the locality of Alt-Hohenschönhausen of the borough of Lichtenberg of Berlin. The team currently plays in the fourth tier Regionalliga Nordost. The club was founded from the football department of sports club SC Dynamo Berlin in 1966. This list covers every season played since the first season of SC Dynamo Berlin. It details the club's achievements in league and cup competitions, and the top goal scorers for each season.

Background
Sports club SC Dynamo Berlin was founded on 1 October 1954. The club entered the 1954-55 DDR-Oberliga after taking over the first team of SG Dynamo Dresden and its place in the league. The team played its first match as SC Dynamo Berlin against BSG Rotation Babelsberg in the 12th matchday on 21 November 1954. SC Dynamo Berlin captured its first title in the 1959 FDGB-Pokal. However, the team would be overshadowed by local rival ASK Vorwärts Berlin in the 1960s. 

Football club BFC Dynamo was founded on 15 January 1966 from the football department of SC Dynamo Berlin. The team finished as runners-up in the 1970-71 FDGB-Pokal and qualified for its first UEFA competition. BFC Dynamo reached the semi-finals of the 1970-71 European Cup Winners' Cup before losing to Dynamo Moscow in a penalty shoot-out. The club thus became the first and so-far only football club in Berlin to have reached the semi-finals of the most prestigious European club competitions. 

BFC Dynamo developed a highly successful youth academy during the 1970s. Full-time coaches were available for all youth classes and the club was able to recruit young talents from training centers of SV Dynamo across East Germany. The youth work laid the groundwork the club’s future successes. BFC Dynamo became East German champions for the first time in the 1978-79 DDR-Oberliga. The team then made its first appearance in the European Cup. BFC Dynamo defeated Nottingham Forest under Brian Clough 0-1 at the City Ground in the quarter-finals of the 1979-80 European Cup. The club thus became the first German football club to defeat an English club in England in the European Cup. 

BFC Dynamo came tho dominate the DDR-Oberliga in the 1980s. The club had the best material conditions in the league and the best team by far. Most of its top performers came through its own youth teams. The team won ten consecutive league titles until the 1987-88 season. However, BFC Dynamo had less success in the FDGB-Pokal during the period, losing three finals. The team eventually completed the Double in the 1987-88 season. Andreas Thom became the league top goal scorer and the footballer of the year in the 1987-88 season.

BFC Dynamo was re-branded as FC Berlin on 19 February 1990. The team finished the 1990-91 NOFV-Oberliga in 11th place and just narrowly failed in the play-offs for the 2. Bundesliga. FC Berlin was qualified for the 1991–92 DFB-Pokal. The team was eliminated in the first round by SC Freiburg. FC Berlin fell on hard times after German reunification. The team never made it beyond third tier in the German football league system. BFC Dynamo won the 1998-99 Berlin Cup and qualified for its second appearance in the DFB-Pokal. BFC Dynamo suffered a financial crisis at the end of the 2000-01 season. Insolvency proceedings were opened against the club on 1 November 2001. The team was consequently relegated to the fifth tier Verbandsliga Berlin.  

BFC Dynamo qualified for the NOFV-Oberliga in the 2003-04 season and successfully brought the insolvency proceedings to a positive conclusion largely through the efforts of supporters and financial contributions from the new presidium. The club consolidated in the NOFV-Oberliga and captured another two Berlin Cup titles. The team was undefeated in the 2013-14 NOFV-Oberliga Nord and finally qualified for the Regionalliga Nordost. The team has since established itself as a strong team in the Regionalliga Nordost and a major competitor in the Berlin Cup.

Seasons

1954–1965

1966-1990

1991–present

Key

Pld – Matches played
W – Games won
D – Games drawn
L – Games lost
GF – Goals for
GA – Goals against
GD - Goal difference
Pts – Points
Pos – Final position

n/a – Not applicable

R1 – Round 1
R2 – Round 2
R3 – Round 3
R16 – Round of 16
QF – Quarter-finals
SF – Semi-finals
RU – Runners-up
W – Winners

Performance chart

See also
History of Berliner FC Dynamo (1954–1978)
 History of Berliner FC Dynamo (1978–1989)
 History of Berliner FC Dynamo (1989–2004)
 History of Berliner FC Dynamo (2004–present)

Explanatory notes

References

General

Specific

 
Football Club
SV Dynamo
Berliner FC Dynamo
German football club statistics